Elna Henrikson was a Swedish figure skater who competed in pair skating.

With partner Kaj af Ekström, she won bronze medals at two World Figure Skating Championships: in 1923 and 1924.

Competitive highlights

References 

Swedish female pair skaters
Date of birth missing
Date of death missing